Gustavo Coutinho Silva Lopes (born 19 January 1999), known as Gustavo Coutinho or simply Coutinho, is a Brazilian footballer who plays as a forward for Atlético Goianiense, on loan from Fortaleza.

Club career
Born in Rio de Janeiro, Coutinho started his career at Audax Rio, and represented Botafogo before moving to Portugal at the age of 17, with Atlético Clube Alcanenense. He made his senior debut with the latter's first team on 26 March 2017, starting in a 0–1 Campeonato de Portugal away loss against Caldas SC.

In 2018, Coutinho returned to his home country after agreeing to a contract with Fortaleza. Initially assigned to the under-20s, he started to feature with the main squad in the following year, but failed to establish himself as a regular for the side.

In September 2020, Coutinho was loaned to Série D side Cabofriense until the end of the year, and debuted at the club with a hat-trick in a 3–3 draw against FC Cascavel. On 10 December, he renewed his contract with Fortaleza until 2022, and extended his loan to Cabofriense the following 9 January.

On 23 February 2021, after four goals in nine matches in the 2021 Campeonato Carioca, Coutinho was recalled by his parent club.

Career statistics

Honours
Fortaleza
Campeonato Cearense: 2019, 2021
Copa do Nordeste: 2019

References

External links
 
 

1999 births
Living people
Footballers from Rio de Janeiro (city)
Brazilian footballers
Association football forwards
Campeonato Brasileiro Série B players
Campeonato Brasileiro Série C players
Campeonato Brasileiro Série D players
A.C. Alcanenense players
Fortaleza Esporte Clube players
Associação Desportiva Cabofriense players
Operário Ferroviário Esporte Clube players
Botafogo Futebol Clube (PB) players
Sport Club do Recife players
Atlético Clube Goianiense players
Campeonato de Portugal (league) players
Brazilian expatriate footballers
Brazilian expatriate sportspeople in Portugal
Expatriate footballers in Portugal